Industrial style or industrial chic refers to an aesthetic trend in interior design that takes cues from old factories and industrial spaces that in recent years have been converted to lofts and other living spaces. Components of industrial style include weathered wood, building systems, exposed brick, industrial lighting fixtures and concrete.

This aesthetic became popular in the late 2000s and remained popular in the 2010s.

Industrial style can also be seen in the use of unexpected materials used in building. Shipping containers are now being used in architecture for homes and commercial spaces. The Industrial style of design is most commonly found in urban areas including cities and lofts. These are prime locations because they provide almost a blank space for homeowners to get started with a fresh canvas. These locations also contain some of the key elements used to achieve this style of design including exposed bricks and pipes, concrete flooring, and large open windows. These elements help give the space a “warehouse” feel which is the ultimate goal of this style of design. This style incorporates raw materials to give the space an unfinished feel.

To achieve an industrial feel, a natural color palette is most commonly used. A mix of grays, neutrals and rustic colors can be seen in these spaces. These simple colors allow for the use of furniture and other accessories to help liven up the room. Also, having the walls a neutral color allows for open areas like lofts to feel bigger and more connected while giving furniture the opportunity to help create a natural flow of the room. 

Large sectionals are a staple item in any industrial style room. This is because of their ability to help close off larger spaces and help divide up the living areas. This is important because spaces like lofts tend to be very open. In order to create the illusion of multiple rooms, a sectional can help block the flow and define a separate living area.
 
As far as lighting goes, floor lamps are trending. Any light fixture with metal finishes fits right into this style.  Large open windows also help bring natural light into the space which can be very beneficial for smaller spaces. Overhead light fixtures can also give the area an industrial ambiance, especially in the kitchen.

To tie into the industrial theme, many homeowners resort to a kitchen island. These islands tend to be made of reclaimed wood or other earthy materials. A kitchen island can also contribute in separating a big room and providing a defined kitchen area. They can be paired with barstools that are made of wood or contain metal finishes. Open faced shelving and storage are big hits when it comes to an industrial kitchen. Free standing metal racks can also provide extra storage and can be beneficial in smaller rooms. If they have wheels, they can multitask. For example, low shelving on wheels can serve as a computer desk one day; the next day it can stand-in as a bar cart.  Exposed overhead beams, brick and concrete are notable accents to the kitchen along with darker cabinets and shelving. Lighter colored floors or polished concrete are ways to incorporate this style into any kitchen.  To modernize this rather rustic look, decorative tiles look great in the kitchen. Tile as a backsplash can help create a modern twist and help liven up the space.

See also
 High-tech architecture
 Revivalism (architecture)
 Rustic modern
 Shabby chic

References

Further reading 

Architectural design

Postmodern architecture
Interior design